
Staszów County is a unit of territorial administration and local government (powiat) in Świętokrzyskie Voivodeship, south-central Poland. It came into being on January 1, 1999, as a result of the Polish local government reforms passed in 1998.

As of 2019 its total population is  67,331, out of which the population of Staszów is  14,762, that of Połaniec is  8,098, that of Osiek is  2,007, and the rural population is  42,464.

Demography 
According to the 2011 Poland census, there were 73,125 people residing in Staszów County, of whom 49.5% were male and 50.5% were female (out of which the population in townships amounts to 25,336, of whom 48.8% were male and 51.2% were female; and the population of the villageships part of the county is 47,789, of whom 49.9% were male and 50.1% were female). In the county, the population was spread out, with 19.8% under the age of 18, 38.7% from 18 to 44, 24.5% from 45 to 64, and 17% who were 65 years of age or older (out of which the population in rural areas amounts to 19% under the age of 18, 39.1% from 18 to 44, 28.2% from 45 to 64, and 13.7% who were 65 years of age or older; and the population of the villageships part of the county is 20.3% under the age of 18, 38.5% from 18 to 44, 22.6% from 45 to 64, and 18.7% who were 65 years of age or older).
 Figure 1. Population pyramid of county in 2010 — by age group and sex
 Figure 2. Population pyramid of townships in 2010 — by age group and sex
 Figure 3. Population pyramid of villageships in 2010 — by age group and sex

Neighbouring counties
Staszów County is bordered by Opatów County to the north-east, Sandomierz County and Tarnobrzeg County to the east, Mielec County and Dąbrowa County to the south, Busko County to the west, and Kielce County to the north-west.

Administrative division
The county is subdivided into eight gminas (three urban-rural and five rural). These are listed in the following table, in descending order of population.

References

External links
Polish official population figures 2006

 
Land counties of Świętokrzyskie Voivodeship